Śmiłowski (feminine: Śmiłowska; plural: Śmiłowscy) is a Polish surname. Notable people with the surname include:

 Karol Grycz-Śmiłowski (1885–1959), Polish Lutheran priest
 Paweł Śmiłowski (born 1998), Polish badminton player

See also
 

Polish-language surnames